In mathematics, an orthogonal symmetric Lie algebra is a pair  consisting of a real Lie algebra  and an automorphism  of  of order  such that the eigenspace  of s corresponding to 1 (i.e., the set  of fixed points) is a compact subalgebra. If "compactness" is omitted, it is called a symmetric Lie algebra. An orthogonal symmetric Lie algebra is said to be effective if  intersects the center of  trivially. In practice, effectiveness is often assumed; we do this in this article as well.

The canonical example is the Lie algebra of a symmetric space,  being the differential of a symmetry.

We say that  is of compact type if  is compact and semisimple. If instead it is noncompact, semisimple, and if  is a Cartan decomposition, then  is of noncompact type.

References 

Lie algebras